Dhantoli (Marathi : धंतोली ) is located in Nagpur, Maharashtra, India. It is densely populated . It is home to a large number of hospitals and other establishments. Initially Dhantoli was the home to Booty the Treasurer of Raja of Nagpur and Marathi Brahmins. Later in the 1950s it became home many Bengali and Maithili Brahmins making it the home to Nagpur's Famous Ram Krishna Mission and Kali Temple. It also has the famous Sai Baba Temple which is near the Iconic Major Surender Deo Park.This area is considered to be the best residential area in the city.

Business center
Dhantoli is a well-known business center in Nagpur, and was seen as an upmarket residential area in the past. This area was home to several successful business executives, corporate money players, professionals, and artists. Vikram Pandit, a former CEO of Citigroup; V.R. Manohar, a prominent Indian lawyer and former Advocate General of Maharashtra; and Shashank Manohar, a former president, Board of Control for Cricket in India (BCCI) and Former model now Ace Fashion and Fitness Photographer Piyush Sharma better known as Nikos Narkissos were all based in this region. . Lokmat and The Hitavada are renowned daily newspapers that are published in Dhantoli. Famous Nagpur Pav-bhaji is from Dhantoli near Yeshwant Stadium.

Sports and Recreation
One of the oldest stadiums in Nagpur, the Yashwant Stadium located just opposite the River Nag, is located in Dhantoli. The stadium needs restoration, since it is largely unused, and is primarily viewed as a street market center used by locals. Patwardhan Grounds, another recreational zone in the area, is a popular venue for organizing activities such as performance exhibitions, and the circus.

References

Neighbourhoods in Nagpur